Beatrice Armari (1877 – 1918) was an Argentinian-Italian botanist and taxonomist noted for her study the flora of Eritrea. Her name appears with the North African species Arnebia lutea (A.Rich.) Armari.

Armari was married to fellow botanist Biagio Longo (1872-1950) who, like her, specialized in the large clade of spermatophytes.

Selected works
She published in the Yearbook of the Royal Botanical Institute in Rome.
Armari, B. (1903). Contribuzione alla studio dell'influenza del clima e della stazione sopra la struttura delle piante della regione mediterranea. (Contribution to the study of the influence of climate and station on plant structure in the Mediterranean region.) Ann. Bot. Pirotta, I, 17–41.
—chapters on Aizoaceae, Umbelliferae, Rubiaceae, and Borraginaceae.

References

1877 births
1918 deaths
Women botanists
20th-century Italian women scientists

20th-century Italian botanists